1917 is a 2019 epic war film co-written and directed by Sam Mendes. The film stars George MacKay, Dean-Charles Chapman, Mark Strong, Andrew Scott, Richard Madden, Claire Duburcq, Colin Firth, and Benedict Cumberbatch. Based in part on an account told to Mendes by his paternal grandfather, Alfred Mendes, it chronicles the story of two young British soldiers in the spring of 1917 during World War I, who are given a mission to deliver a message warning of an ambush, soon after the German retreat to the Hindenburg Line during Operation Alberich. Thomas Newman composed the film's musical score, while Roger Deakins was the cinematographer. Dennis Gassner and Lee Sandales were responsible for the production design, and Scott Millan, Oliver Tarney, Rachael Tate, Mark Taylor, and Stuart Wilson were responsible for the sound effects.

After debuting at the Royal Film Performance on 4 December 2019, Universal Pictures initially gave the film a limited release in eleven cinemas in the United States and Canada on 25 December. The film was later given a wide release in the United States and the United Kingdom on 10 January 2020.  1917 grossed a worldwide total of $385 million on a production budget of $95 million. Rotten Tomatoes, a review aggregator, surveyed 445 reviews and judged 89% to be positive.

The film garnered awards and nominations in a variety of categories with particular praise for its direction, cinematography, sound effects, score, and visual effects. It garnered ten nominations at the 92nd Academy Awards including Best Picture, Best Director for Mendes. The film went on to win three awards, including Best Cinematography (Deakins), Best Sound Mixing (Taylor and Wilson), and Best Visual Effects. At the 73rd British Academy Film Awards, 1917 received nine nominations and won seven awards including Best Film, Best Direction, BAFTA Award for Best Cinematography, and BAFTA Award for Best Production Design. The film received three nominations at the 77th Golden Globe Awards, winning two, including Best Motion Picture – Drama and Best Director.

At the 31st Producers Guild of America Awards, 1917 won for Best Theatrical Motion Picture. Mendes won Outstanding Directing – Feature Film at the 72nd Directors Guild of America Awards. At the 25th Critics' Choice Awards, the film was nominated for eight awards. It won three, including Best Director (tied with Bong Joon-ho for Parasite), Best Cinematography, and Best Editing. In addition, both the American Film Institute and the National Board of Review selected 1917 as one of the top ten films of the year.

Accolades

See also 

 2019 in film

Notes

References

External links 
 

1917